Rewal   is a village in Gryfice County, West Pomeranian Voivodeship, in north-western Poland. It is the seat of the gmina (administrative district) called Gmina Rewal.

The village has a population of 893.

References

External links

Rewal - Old postcards gallery (Polish)
Virtual tour of Rewal
Rewal - Rewahl, Śliwin Bałtycki na portalu polska-org.pl

Villages in Gryfice County